The Knoxville Junior High School in the Knoxville neighborhood of Pittsburgh, Pennsylvania is a building from 1927. It was listed on the National Register of Historic Places in 1987.

References

School buildings on the National Register of Historic Places in Pennsylvania
Tudor Revival architecture in Pennsylvania
Art Deco architecture in Pennsylvania
School buildings completed in 1927
Schools in Pittsburgh
Pittsburgh History & Landmarks Foundation Historic Landmarks
National Register of Historic Places in Pittsburgh
1927 establishments in Pennsylvania